The 1962 New York Mets season was the first regular season for the Mets, as the National League returned to New York City for the first time since 1957. They went 40–120 (.250) and finished tenth and last in the National League,  games behind the NL Champion San Francisco Giants, who had once called New York home. The Mets were the latest team to be 60+ games behind in a division before the 2018 Baltimore Orioles finished 61 games behind the World Series Champion Boston Red Sox. The Mets' 120 losses are the most by any MLB team in one season since the 1899 Cleveland Spiders (20–134, .130). Since then, the 2003 Detroit Tigers and 2018 Orioles have come the closest to matching this mark, at 43–119 (.265), and 47-115 (.290), respectively. The Mets' starting pitchers also recorded a new major league low of just 23 wins all season.

The team lost its first game 11–4 to the St. Louis Cardinals on April 11, and went on to lose its first nine games. Having repaired their record to 12–19 on May 20 after sweeping a doubleheader against the Milwaukee Braves, the Mets lost their next 17 games. They also lost 11 straight from July 15 to July 26, and 13 straight from August 9 to August 21. Their longest winning streak of the season was three.

The Mets were managed by Casey Stengel and played their home games at the Polo Grounds, which was their temporary home while Shea Stadium was being built in Queens. They remain infamous for their ineptitude and were one of the worst teams in Major League Baseball history. Their team batting average, team earned run average (ERA), and team fielding percentage were all the worst in the major leagues that season.

Despite the team's terrible performance, fans came out in droves. Their season attendance of 922,530 was good enough for sixth in the National League that year.

The season was chronicled in Jimmy Breslin's humorous best-selling book Can't Anybody Here Play This Game? The title came from a remark made by manager Casey Stengel expressing his frustration over the team's poor play that year, the first for a long time partnership with TV partner WOR-TV.

Offseason
 July 20, 1961: Paul Blair was signed as an amateur free agent by the Mets.
 October 16, 1961: Billy Loes was purchased by the Mets from the San Francisco Giants.
 November 28, 1961: The Mets traded a player to be named later and cash to the Milwaukee Braves for Frank Thomas and a player to be named later. The deal was completed on May 21, 1962, when the Mets sent Gus Bell to the Braves, and the Braves sent Rick Herrscher to the Mets.
 January 30, 1962: Joe Ginsberg was signed as a free agent by the Mets.
 March 2, 1962: Billy Loes was returned by the Mets to the San Francisco Giants.

Expansion draft

 Craig Anderson, pitcher, St. Louis Cardinals
 Gus Bell, outfielder, Cincinnati Reds
 Ed Bouchee, infielder, Chicago Cubs
 Chris Cannizzaro, catcher, St. Louis Cardinals
 Elio Chacón, infielder, Cincinnati Reds
 Joe Christopher, outfielder, Pittsburgh Pirates
 Choo-Choo Coleman, catcher, Philadelphia Phillies
 Roger Craig, pitcher, Los Angeles Dodgers
 Ray Daviault, pitcher, San Francisco Giants
 John DeMerit, outfielder, Milwaukee Braves
 Sammy Drake, infielder, Chicago Cubs
 Jim Hickman, outfielder, St. Louis Cardinals
 Gil Hodges, infielder, Los Angeles Dodgers
 Jay Hook, pitcher, Cincinnati Reds
 Al Jackson, pitcher, Pittsburgh Pirates
 Sherman Jones, pitcher, Cincinnati Reds
 Hobie Landrith, catcher, San Francisco Giants
 Félix Mantilla, infielder, Milwaukee Braves
 Bob L. Miller, pitcher, St. Louis Cardinals
 Bobby Gene Smith, outfielder, Philadelphia Phillies
 Lee Walls, infielder/outfielder, Philadelphia Phillies
 Don Zimmer, infielder, Chicago Cubs

1961 minor league affiliates
The Mets and Houston Colt .45s were established on October 17, 1960, giving them time to acquire minor league professional players, sign amateur free agents (there was no first-year MLB draft until 1965) and enter into working agreements with minor league affiliates during the 1961 season. New York had formal working agreements with three minor league baseball teams in 1961:

Regular season

Season standings

Opening Day lineup
The first game in franchise history was played on the road, at Busch Stadium, St. Louis, on Wednesday night, April 11, 1962. The Mets fell behind 2-0 and 5–2 early, then narrowed the deficit to one run, but ultimately lost to the St. Louis Cardinals, 11–4.  Former Brooklyn Dodgers Gil Hodges and Charlie Neal homered for the Mets, whose home opener at New York's Polo Grounds would wait until their second-ever official game, on Friday, April 13, 1962.

Record vs. opponents

Notable transactions
 April 26, 1962: Harry Chiti was purchased by the Mets from the Cleveland Indians.
 April 26, 1962: Bob Smith was traded by the Mets to the Chicago Cubs for Sammy Taylor.
 May 1, 1962: Joe Ginsberg was released by the Mets.
 May 7, 1962: Don Zimmer was traded by the Mets to the Cincinnati Reds for Bob G. Miller and Cliff Cook.
 May 7, 1962: Jim Marshall was traded by the Mets to the Pittsburgh Pirates for Vinegar Bend Mizell.
 May 9, 1962: Marv Throneberry was sold by the Baltimore Orioles to the New York Mets. 
 June 7, 1962 The New York Mets sell Hobie Landrith to the Orioles. 
 June 15, 1962: Harry Chiti was returned by the Mets to the Cleveland Indians.
 June 27, 1962: Ed Kranepool was signed as an amateur free agent by the Mets.
 August 4, 1962: Vinegar Bend Mizell was released by the Mets.
 September 7, 1962: Galen Cisco was selected off waivers by the Mets from the Boston Red Sox.

Roster

Player stats

Batting

Starters by position
Note: Pos = Position; G = Games played; AB = At bats; H = Hits; Avg. = Batting average; HR = Home runs; RBI = Runs batted in

Other batters
Note: G = Games played; AB = At bats; H = Hits; Avg. = Batting average; HR = Home runs; RBI = Runs batted in

Pitching

Starting pitchers
Note: G = Games pitched; IP = Innings pitched; W = Wins; L = Losses; ERA = Earned run average; SO = Strikeouts

Other pitchers
Note: G = Games pitched; IP = Innings pitched; W = Wins; L = Losses; ERA = Earned run average; SO = Strikeouts

Relief pitchers
Note: G = Games pitched; W = Wins; L = Losses; SV = Saves; ERA = Earned run average; SO = Strikeouts

Awards and honors

League top five finishers
Richie Ashburn
 #3 in NL in bases on balls (81)

Roger Craig
 MLB leader in losses (24)
 #2 in NL in home runs allowed (35)
 #3 in NL in earned runs allowed (117)

Jay Hook
 #4 in NL in earned runs allowed (115)
 #4 in NL in home runs allowed (31)

Al Jackson
 #2 in NL in losses (20)

Farm system

1962 minor league affiliates

Notes

References
1962 New York Mets at Baseball Reference
1962 New York Mets Roster at Baseball Almanac

New York Mets seasons
New York Mets season
Inaugural Major League Baseball seasons by team
New York Mets
Washington Heights, Manhattan
1960s in Manhattan